Ocean Club Condominiums are twin building condominiums built in 1984 in Atlantic City, New Jersey.

Condominium
The buildings were completed in 1984 and cost $122 million which was received in loans from Bank of America. Drexel Burnham Lambert Realty was the management company of the condo. The average age of those purchasing condos was 45 to 70. George Rebh, Ocean Club sales director, said they were "getting a lot of new-money people - self-made businessmen and doctors and other professionals". The average cost of a condo when the buildings was constructed ranged from $170,000 to $1.7 million.

Entertainers such as Frank Sinatra and Rod McKuen were among the buyers of Ocean Club condos. Residents of the Ocean Club have to pay $7,000 a year in property taxes and a condo fee of $850 per month.

The condo offers "a swimming pool, jacuzzi, gym, parking, and 24-hour front door concierge service". The condominium offers entertainment such as comedy acts. Comedian, Michelle Tomko, from the Broadway Comedy Club, has performed at the Ocean Club.

In 2019, the Celebrity Corner Restaurant located at the Ocean Club sought to expand its outdoor seating.

Notable residents
Frank Sinatra - American singer, actor and producer who was one of the most popular and influential musical artists of the 20th century
Dionne Warwick - six-time Grammy Award-winning singer, actress, television host, and former United Nations Global Ambassador for the Food and Agriculture Organization and United States Ambassador of Health
Rod McKuen - American poet, singer-songwriter, and actor

See also
List of tallest buildings in Atlantic City

References

External links

Residential buildings completed in 1984
Condominiums in the United States
Residential skyscrapers in New Jersey
Residential skyscrapers in Atlantic City, New Jersey